Lawrence Cook may refer to:
 Lawrence Cook (actor) (1930–2003), American actor
 Lawrence Cook (cricketer) (1884–1933), Lancashire cricketer and footballer
 J. Lawrence Cook (1899–1976), piano roll artist
 Lawrence Cook, one of the Carthusian Martyrs

See also
Larry Cook (disambiguation)